Garra tashanensis is a species of ray-finned fish in the genus Garra. This cavefish is endemic to the Tashan Cave located in the Tashan region of Khuzestan Province, Iran.

Description

Garra tashanensis lacks pigment and eyes, its anterior body has few scales.

Etymology

The species tashanensis is named after Tashan region, where the Tashan Cave is located.

References 

Cave fish
Garra
Taxa named by Hamed Mousavi-Sabet
Taxa named by Saber Vatandoust 
Taxa named by Yaser Fatemi
Taxa named by Soheil Eagderi
Fish described in 2016